The Arapahoan languages are a subgroup of the Plains group of Algonquian languages: Nawathinehena, Arapaho, and Gros Ventre.

Nawathinehena is extinct and Arapaho and Gros Ventre are both endangered.

Besawunena, attested only from a word list collected by Kroeber, differs only slightly from Arapaho, but a few of its sound changes resemble those seen in Gros Ventre. It had speakers among the Northern Arapaho as recently as the late 1920s. 

Nawathinehena is also attested only from a word list collected by Kroeber, and was the most divergent language of the group.  

Another reported Arapahoan variety is the extinct Ha'anahawunena, but there is no documentation of it.

Notes

References
 Goddard, Ives (2001). "The Algonquian Languages of the Plains." In Plains, Part I, ed. Raymond J. DeMallie. Vol. 13 of Handbook of North American Indians, ed. William C. Sturtevant. Washington, D.C.: Smithsonian Institution, pp. 71–79.
 Marianne Mithun (1999). The Languages of Native North America. Cambridge Language Surveys. Cambridge: Cambridge University Press.

External links
 "Arapaho" at Native-languages.org
 "Gros Ventre" at Native-languages.org

+
Plains Algonquian languages
Indigenous languages of the North American Plains
Languages of the United States